KLAW (101.3 FM) is a radio station airing a country music format licensed to Lawton, Oklahoma. The station serves the areas of Lawton; Duncan, Oklahoma; Burkburnett, Texas; and Frederick, Oklahoma, and is licensed to Townsquare Media Lawton License, LLC.  Studios are located in downtown Lawton, and the transmitter is located southwest of the city.

References

External links
KLAW's official website

Country radio stations in the United States
LAW
Townsquare Media radio stations